Il Pigmalione (Pygmalion) is a scena lirica (lyric scene or opera) in one act by Gaetano Donizetti. The librettist is unknown, but it is known that the libretto was based on one by Antonio Simeone Sografi for 's Pimmalione (1790), in turn based on Jean-Jacques Rousseau's Pygmalion and ultimately based on Book X of Ovid's Metamorphoses. Sografi's libretto was also used for an opera by Bonifacio Asioli (1796).

This was Donizetti's first opera, written in six days between 25 September and 1 October 1816 when the composer was 19 and a student at the Bologna Academy, a position acquired for him with the help of his teacher in Bergamo, Johann Simon Mayr and where his "gift for spontaneous composition flowered". It has been noted that although the comedy is "musically slender, the score, nevertheless, reveals the fledgling composer's flair for melody".

It was not performed until 13 October 1960.

Performance history

The premiere took place at the XVII Festival delle novità at the Teatro Donizetti in the composer’s home town of Bergamo, Italy, on 13 October 1960. The performance was conducted by Armando Gatto, while the role of Pigmalione was performed by Doro Antonioli and that of Galatea by soprano Oriana Santunione.

Other performances appear to have been sporadic: in 1974 under Bruno Rigacci, it was given by the Orchestra della Radiotelivisione della Svizzera Italiana in Lugano, and a recording made of a performance in 1990 at the Teatro Comunale Giuseppe Verdi in Terni in Umbria. New York City Opera presented the New York City premiere in March 2018.Chicago Opera Theater presented the Chicago premiere in April 2018, in a double bill with Donizetti's Rita.

Roles

Synopsis
Time: The classical past
Place: Cyprus

The story of the opera is based on the famous story of a king and sculptor, Pygmalion, originally taken from the tenth book of the Metamorphoses by Ovid. Pigmalione, dismayed that he may never find in real life the ideal of feminine beauty, creates a sculpture of it himself. Having fallen in love with his own creation, Pigmalione's prayer for the sculpture's (christened Galatea) animation is answered by Venus.

Recordings

References
Notes

Cited sources
Allitt, John Stewart (1991), Donizetti: in the light of Romanticism and the teaching of Johann Simon Mayr, Shaftesbury: Element Books, Ltd (UK); Rockport, MA: Element, Inc.(USA)
Ashbrook, William; Sarah Hibberd (2001), in  Holden, Amanda (Ed.), The New Penguin Opera Guide, New York: Penguin Putnam. .  pp. 224 – 247.
Loewenberg, Alfred (1970). Annals of Opera, 1597–1940, 2nd edition. Rowman and Littlefield
Osborne, Charles, (1994),  The Bel Canto Operas of Rossini, Donizetti, and Bellini,  Portland, Oregon: Amadeus Press. 
 Weinstock, Herbert (1963), Donizetti and the World of Opera in Italy, Paris, and Vienna in the First Half of the Nineteenth Century, New York: Pantheon Books. 

Other sources
Ashbrook, William (1998), "Donizetti, Gaetano" in Stanley Sadie  (Ed.),  The New Grove Dictionary of Opera, Vol. One. London: Macmillan Publishers, Inc.   
Ashbrook, William (1982), Donizetti and His Operas, Cambridge University Press.

External links
Work details and libretto

Operas by Gaetano Donizetti
Italian-language operas
Operas
Operas set in Cyprus
One-act operas
1816 operas
Operas based on Metamorphoses
Works based on Pygmalion from Ovid's Metamorphoses